Apramycin (also Nebramycin II) is an aminoglycoside antibiotic used in veterinary medicine.  It is produced by Streptomyces tenebrarius.

Spectrum of bacterial susceptibility and resistance
Apramycin can be used to treat bacterial infections in animals caused by Escherichia coli, Klebsiella pneumoniae, and Pseudomonas aeruginosa. The following shows susceptibility data on medically significant organisms:
 Escherichia coli - 1 μg/mL - >512 μg/mL (this large range may be due to resistant organisms, typical MIC values are likely in the range of 2 -8 μg/mL.
 Klebsiella pneumoniae - 2 μg/mL - >256 μg/mL
 Pseudomonas aeruginosa - 4 μg/mL

References 

Aminoglycoside antibiotics